These hits topped the Dutch Top 40 in 2007.

Number-one artists

See also

 2007 in music
 List of number-one hits (Netherlands)

References

2007 in the Netherlands
Netherlands
2007